The BRM V12 engine is a V12 Formula One racing engine, designed, developed and built by British manufacturer and constructor BRM, between 1967 and 1977.

Background

The H16 was replaced by a V12 (2.9375 x 2.25 in, 74.61 x 57.15 mm) designed by Geoff Johnson. It had been intended for sports car use, but was first used in F1 by the McLaren M5A. Back at the works, the early V12 years were lean ones. In 1973, Louis Stanley claimed  at 11,750 rpm. The design and building of the first V-12 chassis, the P126 was contracted to former Lotus and Eagle designer Len Terry's Transatlantic Automotive Consultants. The cars first appeared during the 1968 Tasman Championship, powered by 2.5 litre versions of the engine, temporary team driver Bruce McLaren winning the fourth round of the series at Teretonga but being generally unimpressed with the car. BRM themselves built further examples of the Terry design, which were designated P133 and 1968 team drivers Mike Spence and Pedro Rodríguez appeared competitive in early season non championship races at Brands Hatch and Silverstone, but then Spence was killed driving the Lotus 56 turbine during qualifying at Indianapolis. Spence's replacement, Richard Attwood, finished a good second to Graham Hill's Lotus at Monaco, but after this results went downhill and the season petered out ignominiously. For 1969 the four valve per cylinder engine was developed and a new slimline car, the P139 was built. John Surtees joined as the team's lead driver backed up by Jack Oliver. Rodríguez was shunted into the semi-works Parnell team. Surtees' time at BRM was not a happy one and, despite the fact that a ground effect "wing car" was designed, this was never constructed and the team's performances were lacklustre. Surtees left after a single season (1969), along with Tony Rudd who went to Lotus (initially on the road-car side), and Geoff Johnson who departed for Austin Morris.

The team regrouped with Tony Southgate as designer and Rodríguez brought back into the fold to partner Oliver, and gained its first V12 victory when Rodríguez won the 1970 Belgian Grand Prix in a P153, with further victories for Jo Siffert and Peter Gethin in 1971 in the P160. The team had reached one of its intermittent peaks of success. Both Siffert and Rodríguez were killed before the 1972 season and the team had to regroup completely again. Their last World Championship victory came when Jean-Pierre Beltoise drove a stunning race to win the rain-affected 1972 Monaco Grand Prix with the P160. He also won the non-championship 1972 World Championship Victory Race later in the year.  The  campaign was generally chaotic: having acquired major sponsorship, Louis Stanley originally planned to field up to six cars (three for established drivers, three for paying journeymen and young drivers) of varying designs including P153s, P160s and P180s and actually ran up to five for a mix of paying and paid drivers until it became obvious that it was completely overstretched and the team's sponsors insisted that the team should cut back to a more reasonable level and only three cars were run in 1973 for Beltoise, Lauda, and Regazzoni.

References

Engines by model
Gasoline engines by model
V12 engines
Formula One engines